PNEC may refer to:

 Pakistan Navy Engineering College
 Predicted no-effect concentration
 Pulmonary neuroendocrine cells